Hancun may refer to the following locations in China:

Towns (韩村镇)
 Hancun, Anhui, in Suixi County
 Hancun, Yongqing County, Hebei
 Hancun, Xian County, Hebei
 Hancun, Zhao County, Hebei

Townships (韩村乡)
 Hancun Township, Hebei, in Xinshi District, Baoding
 Hancun Township, Henan, in Qingfeng County